or  is a Japanese term meaning "three whites". It was introduced into English by George Ohsawa in the mid-1960s. It is generally referred to in English as "sanpaku eyes" and refers to eyes in which either the white space above or below the iris is revealed. The medical condition in which sclera can be seen below the iris is called "lower scleral show" or "inferior scleral show."

History
According to Chinese/Japanese medical face reading, when the white part of the eye, known as the sclera, is visible beneath the iris, it represents physical imbalance in the body and is claimed to be present in alcoholics, drug addicts, and people who over-consume sugar or grain. Conversely, when the upper sclera is visible it is said to be an indication of mental imbalance in people such as psychotics, murderers, and anyone rageful. In either condition, it is believed that these people attract accidents and violence.

In August 1963, George Ohsawa, an advocate for macrobiotics, predicted that President John F. Kennedy would experience great danger because of his sanpaku condition.

In 1965, Ohsawa, assisted by William Dufty, wrote You Are All Sanpaku, which offers the following perspective on the condition:

According to Ohsawa, this condition could be treated by a macrobiotic diet emphasizing brown rice and soybeans.

In popular culture
John Lennon mentioned sanpaku in his song "Aisumasen (I'm Sorry)" from the 1973 album Mind Games. It is also briefly referenced in William Gibson's novel Neuromancer, as well as in Michael Franks' 1979 song "Sanpaku". The Firesign Theatre's comedy sketch "Temporarily Humboldt County" mentions a character named "Sam Paku". Ken Kesey references 'sanpaku' in the short story "Now We Know How Many Holes It Takes To Fill The Albert Hall", which may be found in Demon Box.
It is also mentioned in the 1998 film Gia, featuring Angelina Jolie as the supermodel Gia Carangi, who dramatically rolled her eyes back to give the ‘Sanpaku’ look in photos. (Methuen, 1986, p. 297).

References

External links
 Sanpaku - The Skeptic's Dictionary

Eye
Physiognomy
Japanese folklore
Fringe science